The 2012 WPS College Draft took place on January 13, 2012. It was the fourth college draft held by Women's Professional Soccer to assign the WPS rights of college players to the American-based teams.

Format
Official WPS release
 The 2012 WPS Draft consists of four rounds and 23 picks overall.
 Draft order is based on the reverse order of the 2011 regular season standings.
 Teams will be allotted three minutes per pick in the first two rounds and five minutes per pick in the second two rounds.

Round 1

Round 2

Round 3

Round 4

Draft Notes
WPS transactions pages '10 '11 '12

See also

2012
WPS Draft